Shaurya Chauhan (born 7 August) is an Indian model, actress and TV host. She was one of the Kingfisher Calendar Girls for 2006. She appeared as an antagonist to Hrithik Roshan's character in Krrish 3.

Early life
Shaurya Chauhan was born in Hyderabad in a Rajput family hailing from Rajasthan. She was a good gymnast during her school days and was very good at extracurricular activities like dance, play and represented her school in gymnastics.

Career
She was spotted by ace lensman Atul Kasbekar and he shot her in the Kingfisher swimsuit calendar in 2006.

Bollywood
She did a small role in Kyon Ki and has played a leading role in Mumbai Salsa. She also acted in Horn 'Ok' Pleassss. She walked out of the movie, Right Yaaa Wrong. She also acted as an antagonist in Krrish 3.

Personal life
She is married to Rishi Chauhan.

Filmography
 Kyon Ki (guest appearance) 
 Mumbai Salsa
 Horn Ok Please
 Sadda Adda
 Krrish 3

References

External links

 

Indian women television presenters
Indian television presenters
Actresses from Hyderabad, India
Rajasthani people
Living people
Actresses in Hindi cinema
Female models from Hyderabad, India
Year of birth missing (living people)